The Honda A series inline-four cylinder engine is used in 1980s Honda Accord and Prelude models. It was introduced in 1982, with the second-generation Honda Prelude, and available in three displacement sizes: 1.6-, 1.8- and 2.0-liters. It features cast iron block and aluminum SOHC head design with three valves per cylinder for a total of 12 valves. It was available in carbureted and fuel-injected configurations

History
The Honda A-series engines succeeded the earlier EZ, ES, BS and ET engines in the Honda Accord and Prelude. There were several variations, ranging from the 1.6-liter A16A to the 2.0-liter A20A.

Beginning in the 1988 model year, in the North American market, the A20A3 and A20A4 used a dual-stage runner intake manifold design, 4-2-1 exhaust manifold, and a more advanced electronic distributor. The Programmed fuel injection engines were equipped with partial OBD-0 engine computers.

Aftermarket
The aftermarket has produced various parts for the Accord and Prelude A series engine. Most upgrades and modifications to the A-series engines are of the do-it-yourself variety, with one of the more popular being a turbo setup and OBD-1 conversion for more tuneability options.

A-Series engines

The engine of the A-series is based on the cylinder block of the 1.8-liter engine: the 1.6-liter engine has a reduced piston stroke, and the 2.0-liter engine is obtained by increasing the cylinder bore.

A16A1
The A16A1 was a carbureted 1.6-liter engine used in 1986–1989 Accords and Vigors outside the North American market. This engine was known as the EZ in 1984 and 1985, non-US Accords.

Specifications
 Induction: Single 2bbl Keihin carburetor
 Displacement: 
 Bore x Stroke: 
 Compression Ratio: 9.0:1
 Power:  at 6000 rpm
 Torque  at 3500 rpm

A18A
The A18A engine was the 1.8-liter engine found in 1982–1987 Honda Prelude and 1986–1988 Accord found in JDM models. Prelude A18A has twin side-draft CV carburetors (also named ET2 in some years) while the Accords came with single down-draught carburetor.

Specifications

Accord
(JDM)
 Induction: Single 2bbl Keihin carburetor
 Displacement: 
 Bore x Stroke: 
 Compression Ratio : 9.0:1
 Power:  at 5800 rpm
 Torque:  at 3500 rpm

Prelude 
(JDM) 
 Induction: Twin side-draft CV carburetors 
 Displacement: 
 Bore x Stroke: 
 Compression Ratio : 9.4:1
 Power:  at 5800 rpm
 Torque:  at 4000 rpm

A20A
The A20A was available in both carbureted and fuel-injected versions. It has a SOHC 12-valve NON-CVCC cylinder head, with two intake valves and one exhaust valve per cylinder. They were found in both Accords and Preludes during the 1980s.

A20A1 & A20A2
The A20A1 and A20A2 were the carbureted versions of the A20A engines. It was available in the 1986–1989 Accord DX and LX. They are the same engine, the only difference between them being that the A20A2 has no emissions components, so it has a slightly higher power output.

Specifications
 Induction: Single 2bbl Keihin Feedback Carburetor
 Exhaust: 4-1 Cast Manifold
 Displacement: 
 Bore x Stroke: 
 Compression Ratio : 9.2:1; 9.1:1 (Accord KX model)
 Power (A20A1):
 
  at 3500 rpm
 Power (A20A2, Indonesia):
  at 5500 rpm
  at 3500 rpm

A20A3 and A20A4
The A20A3 and A20A4 were the fuel injected versions of the A20A engines. They were run by Honda's PGM-FI system on a partial OBD-0 computer. The A20A4 gives a slightly higher power output because of not having emissions components. The A20A3 was offered in the 1984–1987 Honda Prelude 2.0Si, the 1986-1989 Honda Accord LX-i as well as the 1989 Honda Accord SE-i.

In 1988, the A20A3 injection system in the US and Canada has been upgraded with a new two-stage intake manifold (Dual-Stage Intake Manifold) and 4-2-1 exhaust manifold and the compression ratio has been increased from 8.8 to 9.3 netting extra 10hp and 8lb-ft of torque.

Specifications
 Induction: Honda PGM-FI
 Exhaust: 4-1 Cast Manifold (1984–1987); 4-2-1 Cast Manifold (1988-1989)
 Displacement: 
 Bore x Stroke: 
 Compression Ratio : 9.4:1; 8.9:1 (Accord KS Model); 1:8.8 (Accord KX & KG with catalytic converter); 
 Power:
 1984–1987:  at 5500 rpm &  at 4500 rpm
 1988–1989:  at 5500 rpm &  at 4000 rpm

See also
 List of Honda engines

References

A engine
Straight-four engines
Gasoline engines by model